Lu Rongjing (born August 1933) is a Chinese politician who served as governor of Anhui from 1988 to 1989, party secretary of Anhui from 1988 to 1996, and chairman of the Anhui Provincial Committee of the Chinese People's Political Consultative Conference from 1996 to 2000.

He was a delegate to the 7th National People's Congress. He was a member of the Standing Committee of the 9th and 10th Chinese People's Political Consultative Conference. He was a member of the 13th, 14th and 15th Central Committee of the Chinese Communist Party.

Biography
Lu was born in Lujiang County, Anhui, in August 1933. 

He worked in Tongguanshan Copper Mine from 1953 until 1966, when he suffered political persecution at the dawn of the Cultural Revolution. He joined the Chinese Communist Party (CCP) in December 1954. He was soon reinstated in April 1968 as head of the Revolutionary Committee of Tongguanshan Copper Mine. 

He was deputy party secretary of Tongling in January 1973 before being assigned to the similar position in Ma'anshan in November 1976. He was appointed first director of Anhui Provincial Industrial Transportation Office in September 1978, concurrently serving as deputy director of Anhui Provincial Economic Commission. He was chosen as deputy head of Organization Department in January 1980 and three years later was admitted to member of the Standing Committee of the CCP Anhui Provincial Committee, the province's top authority. In December 1984, he was made deputy party secretary of Anhui. In June 1987, he was named acting governor, confirmed in February 1988. Two months later, in April, he was promoted to party chief of Anhui. It would be his first job as "first-in-charge" of a province. In February 1996, he was proposed as chairman of the Anhui Provincial Committee of the Chinese People's Political Consultative Conference, the province's top political advisory body.

References

1933 births
Living people
People from Lujiang County
Governors of Anhui
People's Republic of China politicians from Anhui
Chinese Communist Party politicians from Anhui
Delegates to the 7th National People's Congress
Members of the Standing Committee of the 9th Chinese People's Political Consultative Conference
Members of the Standing Committee of the 10th Chinese People's Political Consultative Conference
Members of the 13th Central Committee of the Chinese Communist Party
Members of the 14th Central Committee of the Chinese Communist Party
Members of the 15th Central Committee of the Chinese Communist Party